Matthias Brandt (born 7 October 1961) is a German actor and audiobook narrator. He has appeared in more than seventy films since 1989.

Early life 
Brandt was born in West Berlin. He is the youngest of the three sons of the former German Chancellor Willy Brandt and his Norwegian-born wife Rut. He has an older half-sister Ninja from his father's first marriage with Carlota Thorkildsen.

Selected filmography

Films & TV movies

Television series

References

External links 

1961 births
Living people
German male film actors
Children of national leaders
German people of Norwegian descent
20th-century German male actors
21st-century German male actors